is a commuter railway station on the Enoshima Electric Railway (Enoden) located in the Shichirigahama-Higashi neighborhood of the city of Kamakura, Kanagawa Prefecture, Japan.

Lines
Shichirigahama Station is served by the Enoshima Electric Railway Main Line and is 5.6 kilometers from the terminus of the line at Fujisawa Station.

Station layout
The station consists of a single side platform serving bi-directional traffic. The station is attended.

Platforms

History 
The station building was rebuilt in 1997.

Station numbering was introduced to the Enoshima Electric Railway January 2014 with Shichirigahama being assigned station number EN09.

Passenger statistics
In fiscal 2019, the station was used by an average of 7,295 passengers daily, making it the 5th used of the 15 Enoden stations 

The average passenger figures for previous years (boarding passengers only) are as shown below.

Surrounding area
Shichirigahama beach

See also
 List of railway stations in Japan

References

External links

Enoden station information 

Railway stations in Kanagawa Prefecture
Railway stations in Japan opened in 1903
Kamakura, Kanagawa